Kentucky Route 299 (KY 299) is a  state highway in the U.S. state of Kentucky. The highway connects mostly rural areas of Calloway and Marshall counties.

Route description
KY 299 begins at an intersection with KY 94 northwest of Wiswell, within Calloway County. It travels to the north and crosses over the West Fork Clarks River. It continues to the north and intersects KY 121. The two highways travel concurrently to the east-southeast. In Stella, they split, with KY 299 resuming it northward trek. Southwest of the Murray-Calloway County Airport, it intersects KY 80. The highway crosses over the West Fork Rockhouse Creek. It enters Kirksey, where it intersects KY 464 (Backusburg Road/Kirksey–Almo Road). After it crosses over the North Fork Duncan Creek, it enters Marshall County and meets its northern terminus, an intersection with KY 402 (Brewers Highway).

Major intersections

See also

References

0299
Transportation in Estill County, Kentucky
Transportation in Powell County, Kentucky